Mityushikha Bay is a bay on Severny Island in Novaya Zemlya, Russia. Nuclear tests were conducted in 1961 in the area of the bay.

Geography
It is a long fjord open to the west near the SW end of the island, just north of the western end of the Matochkin Strait. Gagachy Island is located in the middle of the bay, before the stretch that becomes narrow.

See also
List of fjords of Russia
Raduga (nuclear test)

References

Novaya Zemlya
Fjords of Russia